Olivia Mugove Chitate (born 7 December 1987) is a long-distance runner from Zimbabwe. She competed in the 5000 metres at the 2015 World Championships in Beijing finishing 24th.

International competitions

Personal bests
5000 metres – 16:34.70 (Beijing 2015)

References

Zimbabwean female long-distance runners
Living people
Place of birth missing (living people)
1987 births
World Athletics Championships athletes for Zimbabwe
Athletes (track and field) at the 2015 African Games
Zimbabwean female cross country runners
African Games competitors for Zimbabwe